Cryptolestes pusillus is a species of lined flat bark beetle native to Europe. It is also known as the flat grain beetle. It feeds on grain products, and is considered a pest in Canada.

References

Laemophloeidae
Beetles of Europe
Beetles described in 1817
Taxa named by Carl Johan Schönherr